Gulab Jung Shah is a Nepalese politician from Karnali Province. He is a member of Provincial Assembly of Karnali Province belonging to the CPN (UML). Shah, a resident of Bangad Kupinde, was elected via 2017 Nepalese provincial elections from Salyan 1(A) constituency. He was appointed the Chief Whip of CPN (UML) and also the party co-incharge for Salyan District, Nepal since 2019. Later, the ruling parliamentary party leader and former Chief minister of Karnali Province, Mahendra Bahadur Shahi has removed him as the party's chief whip in 2020.

Electoral history

2017 Nepalese provincial elections

References

Living people
Year of birth missing (living people)
21st-century Nepalese politicians
Members of the Provincial Assembly of Karnali Province
People from Salyan District, Nepal
Communist Party of Nepal (Unified Marxist–Leninist) politicians